Umakant Singh is an Indian politician belonging to Bharatiya Janata Party. He was elected as a member of Bihar Legislative Assembly from 7 Chanpatia constituency, Paschim Champaran in 2020 Bihar Legislative Assembly election. He was elected as Mukhiya (Gram pradhan) in 2001, 2006, 2011 & 2016 from Gonauli Panchayat, West Champaran, Bihar. He holds strong hold in Bhumihar (upper caste) community. He’s known by his work and presence in public. He’s ground rooted and humble for his people.

References

Living people
Bihar MLAs 2020–2025
Bharatiya Janata Party politicians from Bihar
1974 births